The Masku railway station is a closed station located in the municipality of Masku, Finland. It is located along the Turku–Uusikaupunki railway; the nearest station with passenger services is Turku in the southwest.

History 
Masku is one of the original stations of the Uusikaupunki railway, having been opened as a laiturivaihde – a staffed halt with a rail yard containing at least one switch – with the rest of the line on 1 September 1923. It was subservient to the Raisio station, and was only staffed by a single worker, who was accommodated with a sauna, barn as well as a hectare's worth of farmland. The station also hosted a post office until 1956, after which it moved into a building owned by the Maskun Säästöpankki bank.

Masku grew greatly in the post-war era, no less in part due to evacuees settling there from the parts of Karelia ceded to the Soviet Union; in 1947, 30% of the people living in the municipality had emigrated there from elsewhere. However, in 1967, Masku became an unstaffed station on 1 June 1967, and its rail yard was dismantled in 1978, making it a halt. The halt was closed altogether on 1 January 1993 upon the cessation of passenger services on the Uusikaupunki line.

References 

Railway stations opened in 1923
Railway stations opened in 1993
Defunct railway stations in Finland
Railway stations in Southwest Finland